The Anarthriaceae are a family of three genera, Anarthria, Hopkinsia and Lyginia of flowering plants, now included in Restionaceae following APG IV (2016). The family is accepted in the Angiosperm Phylogeny Group's classification system, APG III system, but is not considered a separate family in many other taxonomic systems. The three genera are herbaceous but differ greatly in characteristics.

The APG II system, of 2003 (unchanged from the APG system, of 1998), does recognize this family, and assigns it to the order Poales in the clade commelinids, in the monocots.  The family contains three genera and 10 species, and is found in Southwest Australia.

References

External links 
 Links at CSDL

Poales of Australia
Angiosperms of Western Australia
Plant families endemic to Australia
Poales families
Historically recognized angiosperm families
Poales